The Journal of Food Composition and Analysis is a peer-reviewed scientific journal focusing on human food composition.

External links 
 

Elsevier academic journals
Nutrition and dietetics journals
Publications established in 1987
English-language journals